The Narcisse Snake Dens is a provincial wildlife management area located in the Rural Municipality of Armstrong about  north of Narcisse, Manitoba. The dens are the winter home of tens of thousands of red-sided garter snakes (Thamnophis sirtalis parietalis). These pits are the largest known concentration in the world of this particular type of snake. Their winter dens are caverns formed by the area's water-worn limestone bedrock. In the spring, they come up from their dens to the snake pits, where they mate, then they disperse into the nearby marshes for the summer.

Conservation 

The population of red-sided garter snakes around Narcisse was roughly 70,000 until terrible weather in 1999 killed tens of thousands of them before they could reach their winter dens.  This tragedy triggered concern about the snakes' biannual migratory path, which cuts right across Highway 17. Every year, 10,000 snakes trying to get to or from their winter dens had been crushed under the wheels of vehicles. This had not been a problem before, because the vast population compensated for the losses. After the winter of 1999, however, the population of garter snakes was dangerously low, causing Manitoba Hydro and volunteers to intervene.

Foot-high snow fences were built to force snakes into six-inch (15-cm) tunnels that went under Highway 17. Since some snakes still managed to squeeze under the fence and onto the road, signs were put up during the migratory season urging motorists to slow down to avoid accidentally driving over snakes. These measures worked, and now fewer than 1000 snakes per season are killed on the highway.

Visiting 
The conservation area is open to the public.  The snakes are most active during the spring and fall, in late April to early May, which is the mating season, and also in early September, when the snakes slither back down to their winter dens.

See also 
 Rae Bridgman (author of The MiddleGate Books, which feature the snakes of Narcisse, Manitoba)

References

External links 
 The Snakes of Narcisse | Wildlife and Ecosystem Protection (Province of Manitoba)
 Snakes Alive! (Nature North Zine)
 NatureNorth's - Narcisse Snake Dens Videos
 Narcisse Wildlife Management Area, MB, CA on iNaturalist

 If You're Scared of Snakes, Don't Watch This, National Geographic News

Geography of Manitoba
Natural history of Manitoba
Wildlife management areas of Manitoba